Radoje Domanović (Serbian Cyrillic: Радоје Домановић; February 16, 1873 – August 17, 1908) was a Serbian writer and teacher, most famous for his satirical short stories. His adult years were a constant fight against tuberculosis. This circumstance of his life, and the affection which he inspired in all who knew him, created an aura of romanticism and sentimentality which stand in contrast to his literary accomplishments as a satirist and a powerful critic of the contemporary Serbian society.

Biography

Domanović was born in the village of Ovsište which is located in Topola municipality, Šumadija District. He attended a gymnasium in Kragujevac. Two of his teachers, Pera Đorđević and Sreten Stojković, who were followers of Svetozar Marković, were arrested for an attempt to take control of the local government and displaying a red flag. From 1890 to 1894, Domanović studied history and philology at Belgrade's Grande École. He read some of his first works to the members of a student organization Pobratimstvo (Bloodbrothers). Domanović was among the first writers to begin to produce an independent expression of their own urban experience in their new works, and it was not long before the term "Belgrade prose" (beogradska proza) was adopted to refer to this trend in which Belgrade played an important role, not just as the setting for action but almost as an actor itself.

Domanović is considered the best satirist in all Serbian literature during the turn of the 20th century. A gifted writer interested in politics, Domanović wielded his implacable pen against the injustices of a democracy in the making.

Writing humorous and satirical stories, Domanović is particularly remembered for his Kraljević Marko po drugi put među Srbima (Kraljević Marko for the Second Time among the Serbs). Re-inventing the folk hero Prince Marko, Domanović places him in the modern world. Hearing the wails and laments of his fellow Serbs, Marko asks permission from God to return to earth that he might help them. His wish is granted, and the brave and strong Marko finds himself in Belgrade. Unfortunately, his way of dealing with situations—by striking his enemies with his heavy mace—is not appreciated either by the authorities or by the ordinary men and women in the street. There are many lessons that Marko must learn, if he is to succeed.

In 1893, Domanović wrote and published his first work, a short story Na mesečini (In the Moonlight), in a popular magazine for intellectuals called Javor. Two years later, he got his first tenure as a lecturer in a gymnasium in Pirot. There he met Jaša Prodanović, who helped found the Serbian independent Radical Party in 1901. At that time, Domanović joined Republikanska stranka (The Republican Party), and married Natalija Ristić. He took an active part to maintain the doctrine of republicanism during the time of the monarchy. He was threatened repeatedly not to criticize The Establishment. After nine months, he was transferred, as a punishment on request of his political rivals, to a gymnasium in Vranje. On the same count, after a year in Vranje, he was transferred to Leskovac. Following a critical speech on the position of teachers in 1898, he was dismissed from his post, along with his wife. As a response, he wrote a short story Ukidanje strasti (The Tearing of Passion).

In 1899, he published two collections of short stories and his famous story Danga, perhaps an inspiration for Yevgeny Zamyatin's We. The following year, he got a well-paying, government job as a clerk in the State's Archive. In 1902, after he published Stradija, he was again dismissed from his post. In the mythical land of "Stradije" Domanović shows how police spared voters from troubling themselves to cast votes in free elections while government ministers played musical chairs. (Even at the end of the twentieth century there is nothing to add to the criticism of the mentality of slavery, of political deceit, and of the propaganda that always succeeds). Domanović started writing editorials for magazine Odjek (Echo). After the coup in 1903, Domanović returned to his post, and soon got a stipend to work on his stories. It was rumoured that the coup saved his life, since he was on a list for liquidation of the old government. In 1904, he started a magazine Stradija, that had 35 editions. The following year, he was appointed to the State Press corps. He died in 1908 of tuberculosis survived by his wife, son Zoran and daughter Danica.

Short stories

Domanović was among the first writers (along with Milutin Uskoković, Rastko Petrović, Bogdan Popović, Jovan Skerlić, and others) to begin to produce an independent expression of their own urban experience in their new works, and it was not long before the term "Beogradska proza"—the Belgrade prose—was adopted to refer to this trend in which the city played an important function, not just as the setting for action but almost as an actor itself.

Domanović could be compared to Jonathan Swift, and indeed, some critics have suggested that he is the  Serbian Swift, as he was exceptionally skilled in writing caustic satire rendering his stories overwhelmingly pessimistic and bleak.

Domanović lived for only 35 years and did not publish much, leaving some work in manuscript form. But in the last years of his brief life he projected and in part completed an ambitious fictional project which did justice to his theories. He proposed to tell in a series of short stories the wrongdoings and excesses in the political and social life of a society trying to find itself. Some of his most famous stories are:

Stradija (Land of Tribulation), an allegory in which he castigated the ruthlessness of the authority and obsequiousness of its subjects.
Danga (The Stigma), a story about the author's dream of visiting an imaginary country where all people blindly follow their leaders in a dystopian society. After all of the citizens were branded on the forehead, without complaints, the story culminates when the narrator proclaims that he, as a Serb, is much braver then anybody and requests to be branded ten times.
Ukidanje strasti (Abolishing Passion), a satirical fiction about a legislation that outlawed passion, after which people stopped doing things like smoking, drinking, or taking political participation.
Razmišljanje jednog običnog srpskog vola (Reasoning of an Ordinary Serbian Ox), criticizes Serbian misuse of their history and tradition as well as rampant exploitative behavior from the point of view of an ox. Upon seeing his master's and his countrymen's immorality and hypocrisy, the ox suddenly starts thinking rationally out of sheer pain and desperation.
Kraljević Marko po drugi put među Srbima (Kraljević Marko Among the Serbs For the Second Time), a story of a return of an epic Serbian hero, and the false promises for a better future.
Mrtvo more (Dead Sea), a story about resistance of masses against any kind of progress.
Vođa (The Leader), a story about incompetent leadership: people who chose a person they never saw before to lead them to a better place. After suffering through a long trip, they realized that their leader was blind. It was attack on Nikola Pašić, leader of People's Radical Party, after Domanović became disillusioned by Pašić's moderate stance toward royal regime.

Legacy
Many primary schools and libraries (in Leskovac, Surdulica, Rača, Topola and Velika Plana) in Serbia are named after Radoje Domanović. “Radoje Domanović” foundation awards the eponymous award for satirical works and overall contribution to Serbian satire.
 
“Radoje Domanović” Project was initiated in 2013 with the goal to digitize collected works of Radoje Domanović, and make them more widely available to readers worldwide by publishing translations of Domanović’s short stories.

References

 Adapted from Serbian Wikipedia article: :sr:Радоје Домановић
 Translated and adapted from Jovan Skerlić's Istorija Nove Srpske Književnosti / History of New Serbian Literature (Belgrade, 1921), pages 403-405.

External links

Complete Works of Radoje Domanović
Full text of several short stories (in Serbian)
 "Pripovetke" (1905): https://archive.org/stream/pripovetke01domagoog#page/n5/mode/2up

1873 births
1908 deaths
People from Topola
People from the Principality of Serbia
Serbian writers
Serbian short story writers
Aphorists
Serbian science fiction writers
Belgrade Higher School alumni
Burials at Belgrade New Cemetery
20th-century deaths from tuberculosis
Tuberculosis deaths in Serbia
Writers from the Kingdom of Serbia